Articles on Tetrasomy include:

 Tetrasomy
 Tetrasomy 9p
 Tetrasomy 18p
 Tetrasomy 18p Canada